Donnelley Wildlife Management Area or Donnelley WMA is an undeveloped  natural area in Colleton County, South Carolina near the unincorporated area of Green Pond. Named after Gaylord and Dorothy Donnelley who were instrumental in leading land preservation efforts in the ACE Basin, Donnelley WMA is owned and managed by the South Carolina Department of Natural Resources (SCDNR).

See also
 ACE Basin

External links
 Donnelley Wildlife Management Area

Protected areas of Colleton County, South Carolina
Wildlife management areas of South Carolina